Trade unions in Nauru. With a tiny population of 13,000 Nauru does not have a trade union structure.

Trade union rights

There are constitutional provisions for the general right to belong to trade unions and other associations, however, in the past efforts to form unions have met with government discouragement.

Little attempts at worker affiliation

Unlike the situation which exists in some countries, political parties are not involved in coordinated attempts to work and encourage organized labour; the party system itself in Nauru is not widely developed.

Nauru is not a member of the International Labour Organization.

Foreign workers

There are many foreign workers in Nauru in proportion to the local population. Some of these, including a sizeable number of Tuvalu nationals, are not infrequently owed back-pay, given the economic difficulties which beset the country. The issue of the rights of expatriate workers is arguably a lower priority to political representatives in Nauru.

References